The Nulato Hills are a mountain range in western Alaska between the Yukon River and Norton Sound. In the north, they merge into the lowlands of the Selawik River, in the south they extend into the Yukon-Kuskokwim Delta. At the Seward Peninsula level, the continental divide runs through the Nulato Hills. The Anvik River and the Bonasila River have their source in the Nulato Hills.

Between Kaltag on the Yukon and Unalakleet on the coast of Norton Sound, there is the Kaltag Portage, a passage through the coastal mountains, which was also used in 1925 for the dog sled relay to Nome caused by a diphtheria epidemic and is now part of the Iditarod Trail Sled Dog Race.

References 

Mountain ranges of Alaska
Landforms of Nome Census Area, Alaska
Landforms of Yukon–Koyukuk Census Area, Alaska